Trangan is an island in the Aru Islands in the Arafura Sea. It is situated in the Maluku Province of Indonesia. Its area is 2149 km². The other main islands in the archipelago are Tanahbesar (also called Wokam), Kola, Kobroor, Koba, and Maikoor.

References 

Aru Islands
Islands of the Maluku Islands
Uninhabited islands of Indonesia